Mulyeongari-oreum is a lake and wetland located on Jeju island. It is the only wetland in Korea which is located within a volcanic crater in a parasitic cone, called an oreum in the Jeju dialect of Korean. The oreum is one of the secondary volcanoes around the Hallasan volcano, which is the highest mountain in South Korea. Through continuing scientific research, it is thought that Mulyeongari-oreum was formed by volcanic activity continuing for 2,500 years at the end of the third Cenozoic Era on Jeju Island. On top of the oreum, there is a shallow crater lake which displays a unique example of a wetland. The level of water changes with the seasons due to rainfall and the particular geology. Some 370 parasitic cones are located around Hallasan. Only about 30% of them have mountain craters. The geology is mostly composed of water-permeable basalt, so it is unusual to have a lake on top of such volcanic cones. During the dry season, most of wetland becomes dries out, except the deepest part in the south (about 50m of water depth). During the rainy season, most of it is submerged.

Characteristics
The mountain crater lake formed in a volcanic crater, 900m-937m above sea-level, 9km northeast of Hallasan. The 628000m2 lake provides water, which is not abundant on the island, to the indigenous wildlife.

Mulyeongari-oreum is located on the Mt. Suryeong (sea level attitude : 508m) on the Halla mountain in Jeju island. It is a typical parasitic cone and the mouth of a volcano has a girth of 300m, 40m in depth and 1,000m circumference around the crater. Viewed from the summit of the mountain north of crater, its external shape has a concentric circle and hollowed surface in the middle of crater respectively.

The oreum forms a shallow crater lake on top of it. The level of water in the crater-lake changes by the seasons. In the dry season, the crater-lake maintains lower level which makes the area have wetland personalities. Organic materials flow down the slope around the wetland and gather the bottom of the crater which the wetland is located. The wetland displays the distinctive layer of floras. The wetland does not show wide biodiversity.

The wetland also exhibits the characteristics of the wetlands in temperate climate zone and high moor due to the height of the mountain (508m), at which Mulyeongari-oreum is located.

The wetland forms a closed ecosystem due to the shape of the crate which the wetland is placed. This closed ecosystem presents a distinctive fauna. Particularly near the wetland, different plants are growing in concentric circles. Due to the closed circulation of ecosystem, the wetland is claimed to face easy degradation and extinction.

Flora and fauna
Insects
 giant water bug (Lethocerus deyrollei)
 Plateumaris sericea
 Gryllotalpa orientalis
 Anisodactylus signatus
 Fabriciana nerippe coreana (F:Papilionoidea) 
 Lethocerus deyrollei (F: Belostomatidae).
47 insect species in 24 families, 5 orders, were observed

Amphibians
 boreal digging frog (Kaloula borealis)
 Rana nigromaculata
 Hynobius leechii
2 orders, 3 families, 6 species (37 individuals) in amphibians and 1 order, 3 families, 8 species (15 individuals) were found and captured

Birds
 Peregrine falcon (Falco peregrinus)
 Fairy pitta (Pitta brachyura nympha)
 Black kite (Milvus migrans)
 Japanese sparrowhawk (Accipiter gularis)
 Japanese paradise-flycatcher (Terpsiphone atrocaudata)
 Black paradise flycatcher (Terpsiphone atrocaudata)

Plants
 Painted Maple (Acer pictum subsp. mono) 
 Carpinus laxiflora
 Cornus kousa
 Euonymus fortunei
 Juncus effusus
 Paeonia obovata
 Persicaria hydropiper
 Persicaria thunbergii
 Polygonum muricatum
 Rosa multiflora
 Rubus coreanus
 Scirpus triqueter
 Smilax china
 Torreya nucifera

210 plants (74 family 154 genus) were observed, another source states 69 families, 136 genera, 181 species of flowering plants exist here.

References
Information sheet on Ramsar Wetlands

Korea's Ramsar Wetlands

Geography of Korea